Az Athenaeum kézi lexikona, in English: Handbook of the Athenaeum, subtitled The Encyclopaedia of Science with Special Reference to Hungary  was a two-volume general lexicon in the Hungarian language that was first published at the end of 19th century.

Description 
The work was, published in 1892–1893 by Athenaeum Irodalmi és Nyomdai Rt..  It had a total length of about 1,900 pages (more precisely, 3,840 large 8 ° columns) . The cover of the volumes has an ornate design, similar to the large lexicon of Pallas, which appeared almost at the same time.

According to a contemporary book review, the volumes were edited by the historian Ignác Acsády.  It listed what was considered to be all branches of human knowledge:

    literature
    history
    law and political science
    economics and finance
    philosophy
    geography
    natural history
    natural science
    astronomy
    chemistry
    medicine
    military sciences
    music
    sports
    engineering, mechanical and technical sciences,
    and  biographies

In an ABC-like way, “using the latest advances, advances, research and data in line with today’s level of science,” so that the work can serve the interests not only of professionals but also of the wider readership.

The publishers placed great emphasis on making the work a Hungarian-style work, ie it also deals in depth with scientific and artistic topics related to Hungary. In addition, pictorial appendices (“16 color worksheets, 32 maps, 34 double-sided blackboards, 14 tables”) were filed to better process knowledge across multiple topics. The goal was to make the lexicon a library for all Hungarian families. At the same time, in order to emphasize its European significance, it was indicated in the description that the work could be a special Hungarian supplement to the famous German Conversations Lexicon. It was offered to customers in an ornate half-leather binding for HUF 14, and in a laced version for HUF 12.

The work does not have a reprint edition,

References

Sources 
 Antikvarium.hu
 Arcanum
 MEK
 Magyar katolikus lexikon I–XV. Főszerk. Diós István; szerk. Viczián János. Budapest: Szent István Társulat. 1993–2010. 

Hungarian encyclopedias